
Zemlya, meaning earth, land in several Slavic languages, may refer to:

Geography
Belaya Zemlya, a group of three glaciated islands in the Russian high Arctic
Gusinaya Zemlya, a peninsula in the Russian Arctic, the largest peninsula of Novaya Zemlya
Malaya Zemlya, an outpost in southern Russia during World War II
Novaya Zemlya, a small archipelago in the Russia Arctic Ocean
Severnaya Zemlya, a small archipelago in the Russian high Arctic
Zemlya Georga, an island in the Russian high Arctic

Other
Earth (1930 film), a Soviet silent film written and directed by Alexander Dovzhenko
Mat Zemlya, the oldest deity in Slavic mythology
Rodnaya Zemlya, a weekly newspaper published in Russia in 1907

See also
 Zemlja (disambiguation)
 Ziemia